The 116th Military Intelligence Brigade (Aerial Intelligence) (116th MIB) is an intelligence brigade in the U.S. Army charged with conducting 24/7 tasking, collection, processing, exploitation, dissemination and feedback operations of multiple organic and joint Aerial-Intelligence, Surveillance, and Reconnaissance (A-ISR) missions collected in overseas contingency areas of operation.

History
The 116th MI Bde was constituted May 10, 1946, as the 116th Counterintelligence Corps Detachment.  It was activated May 31, 1946, in Washington, DC.  The unit was allotted to the regular army on March 5, 1951.  In 1959, it was redesignated as the 116th Counterintelligence Corps Group, redesignated as the 116th Intelligence Corps Group in 1961, and then redesignated as the 116th Military Intelligence Group in October 1966.  On January 9, 1973, the unit was deactivated in Washington, DC.  It was later redesignated in February 1999, as Headquarters and Headquarters Detachment, 116th Military Intelligence Group and activated June 16, 2000, at Fort Gordon, Georgia.  The 116th was deactivated again Sept. 30, 2009.

In August 2014, the designation Headquarters and Headquarters Company, 116th Military Intelligence Brigade was reserved for activation Oct. 15, 2015.  The US Army approved the establishment of an aerial intelligence brigade and designated the 116th to fulfill the mission.  According to the US Army, the 116th MI Bde will continue to grow in the coming years.

Units
  Headquarters and Headquarters Company
 Distributed Common Ground System-Army Operations and Exploitation Unit
 138th Military Intelligence Company (Joint Surveillance Target Attack Radar System-Army element), Robins Air Force Base (previously a direct reporting unit of INSCOM)
  3rd Military Intelligence Battalion (Aerial Exploitation), Camp Humphreys (previously aligned under the 501st Military Intelligence Brigade)
  15th Military Intelligence Battalion (Aerial Exploitation), Fort Hood (previously aligned under the 500th Military Intelligence Brigade)
  204th Military Intelligence Battalion (Aerial Exploitation), Fort Bliss 
 Company D (RO-6A)
  206th Military Intelligence Battalion (Aerial Exploitation), Fort Hood 
  224th Military Intelligence Battalion (Aerial Exploitation), Hunter Army Airfield (previously aligned under the 513th Military Intelligence Brigade)
 United States Army Intelligence & Security Command (INSCOM) Processing, Exploitation, and Dissemination (PED) Battalion, Fort Gordon

References

Military intelligence brigades of the United States Army
Military units and formations established in 2015